Parornix compsumpta is a moth of the family Gracillariidae. It is known from the Peloponnisos region in Greece and North Macedonia.

References

Parornix
Moths of Europe
Moths described in 1987